Buon Natale: The Christmas Album is the third studio album and first Christmas album by Italian operatic pop trio Il Volo, The album features the three singers taking on classic American Christmas songs, many of which are relatively unknown in Italy.  
The album is the unofficial soundtrack to a PBS holiday television special, Il Volo Buon Natale.

Il Volo toured North American with this album. The trio’s live performances received standing ovations across the U.S. and critical acclaim.

Charts

Year-end charts

Certifications

Track listing

International Edition

Italian Edition

References

2013 Christmas albums
Christmas albums by Italian artists
Geffen Records albums
Albums produced by Humberto Gatica
Il Volo albums